Sacrifice is a 2011 American/Canadian action thriller film written and directed by Canadian film director Damian Lee, and starring Cuba Gooding Jr. and Christian Slater. It was filmed in Ottawa, Ontario. The film was produced by Zed Filmworks based in Ottawa, as well as Styx Productions. This film was released direct-to-video.

The main theme of the film is child abduction. In the film, an undercover cop is entrusted with the care of a 5-year-old girl. The girl is kidnapped shortly after, and the cop has to locate and retrieve her.

Plot
A tough undercover cop named John (Cuba Gooding Jr.) inadvertently gets involved in a dangerous heroin ring when Mike (Devon Bostick), a young defector of the drug trade leaves his five-year-old sister, Angel (Arcadia Kendal) within his care. After Mike is killed, Angel is kidnapped and trapped in an underground drug ring. John then sets out to save the girl with the help of Father Porter (Christian Slater).

John is initially acquainted with the priest after the death of his family in an underground operation that went south, where his wife and daughter were the victims. His life after the murder has him finding solace in alcohol as he turns to Father Porter for salvation in his attempts to save Angel. Unbeknownst to this, Father Porter enlists in the help of John once the statues within his church are stolen by violent criminals and he too is then wrapped up in the whirlwind of this world of crime and punishment.

Cast
 Cuba Gooding Jr. as John Hebron 
 Lara Daans as Jade 
 Christian Slater as Father Porter
 Kim Coates as Arment
 Devon Bostick as Mike Lopez
 Hannah Chantée as Noelle Hebron
 Arcadia Kendal as Angel
 Athena Karkanis as Rachel

Production 
The casting of this film was done by Stephanie Gorin and Ilona Smyth, the costume designer was Ton Pascal, and the production designer was Lisa Soper. This film was also executively produced by Jeff Sackman, Darren Bell, and Adrian Love. In this film Kim Coates and Stephanie Gorin were also responsible for co-executive producing.

The production began March 28, 2010 in Ottawa, Ontario on the indie crime film into late April. The reported budget of the film is $6.8 million. Although the film is set in Los Angeles and Toronto, the production team dressed the streets of Ottawa to look more like these cities while making the most of their surroundings. The film being filmed outside of Toronto had to do with the preferable provincial tax breaks given to filmmakers who film in other areas of the province. With this push, it was reported that in the year of 2011, Canadian-owned and controlled distributors were responsible for 77% of films released in Canada (both Canadian and non-Canadian films).

According to Robert Menzies of the production team "the movie has a lot of religious overtones...it's a no-holds barred action film with lots of interesting themes."

Release
The film was distributed exclusively through Alliance Films in Canada on April 26, 2011. It was also released on DVD and Blu-ray in the United States through Millennium Entertainment. The international release of this film was handled through Bliss Media (China), ACE Entertainment (France), Emerald (Argentina) and Sony Pictures Home Entertainment (Australia) respectively. The release was handled by Tanweer Films for most of South Asia, including Bangladesh, Bhutan, India, Maldives, Nepal, Pakistan and Sri Lanka.

References

External links
 

2011 films
2011 direct-to-video films
2011 action thriller films
American action thriller films
American independent films
Canadian action thriller films
English-language Canadian films
Films about the illegal drug trade
Films directed by Damian Lee
Films set in Los Angeles
Films set in Toronto
Films shot in Ottawa
2011 independent films
Films with screenplays by Damian Lee
Films about police officers
Films about child abduction
2010s English-language films
2010s Canadian films
2010s American films